Wood Norton Hall is a Grade II* listed Victorian stately home to the northwest of Evesham, Worcestershire, England. It was the last home in England of Prince Philippe, Duke of Orléans, who claimed the throne of France.

Used by the British Broadcasting Corporation during World War II as a station for listening to enemy radio broadcasts and an emergency broadcasting centre, it became the accommodation for the BBC's engineering training college that grew up in its grounds. The BBC retained purpose-built facilities in the grounds for technical training after selling the Hall, which became a hotel.

History
The site of a dwelling since medieval times, Wood Norton was once the home of Prince Philippe, Duke of Orléans, the last pretender to the throne of France. The 'Great Gates' at the entrance of the house had once stood before York House in Twickenham, the Duke's previous home .

Its position - hidden within acres of remote woodland on a hill facing south - made it ideal for official use in the event of war. In early 1939, the BBC bought the site so that it could relocate its operations away from London and other urban centres in the event of hostilities. A number of temporary buildings were quickly erected around the hall to provide an emergency broadcasting centre. A dozen studios were built, and by 1940 Wood Norton was one of the largest broadcasting centres in Europe with an average output of 1,300 programmes a week.

Many refugees from all over war-torn Europe were recruited and then billeted in Evesham and the surrounding area; they became specialised broadcasters to the Resistance and special operations groups around Europe sending their secret messages encrypted into what appeared to be normal entertainment broadcasts.

It was the home of the BBC's Monitoring Service from August 1939 until early 1943, when Monitoring moved to Caversham Park and Crowsley Park, near Reading. The move was made to release space at Wood Norton so that it could become the BBC's main broadcasting centre, should London have to be evacuated because of the threat from Germany's V-weapons. A fire during the war destroyed the Hall's upper storeys in 1942. The roof was repaired and reinstated by the BBC Architectural & Civil Engineering Department in 1991–92.

After the war, Wood Norton became the home of the BBC Engineering Training Department. During the Cold War it was designated as a broadcasting centre in the event of a nuclear attack.

In March 2013, the BBC vacated Television Centre (TVC) in West London, requiring strategic relocation of operations. The Satellite Earth Station (SES) was constructed at Wood Norton to relocate shared infrastructure previously housed at TVC.

The nuclear bunker
In 1966, and into the late 1960s, Bredon Wing was built as an addition to the training centre, containing a  nuclear fallout bunker beneath it. A mast was constructed on top of the hill behind the hall and was fitted with an SHF dish (microwave link) to Daventry radio transmitting station (referred to in 1975 Cabinet papers released 30 December 2005).

Two VHF yagi aerials were fitted to receive signals from the transmitters at Holme Moss and Llandrindod Wells. Later, another SHF link was fitted to the Pebble Mill studios in Birmingham, to provide reliable TV reception for the technical training facilities as the local terrestrial TV signal was poor.

The bunker (known as PAWN – Protected Area Wood Norton) and mast, and many other installations, were referred to as "deferred facilities" within the BBC. Few staff knew their full extent and those that did had to be vetted by the Ministry of Defence and sign the Official Secrets Act (OSA). However, in the 1970s when training studio space was at a premium at Wood Norton, the bunker was opened up and made available for general training use.  Staff on site were disappointed to discover that it was only two storeys deep.

The "deferred facilities" were modified many times over the years. In the 1970s they were extended and updated to be able to provide the "Wartime Broadcasting Service".

BBC Academy
The estate has been the home of the BBC's Engineering Training Department since the war, now branded as part of the College of Technology, a constituent of the wider BBC Academy. Training staff run residential courses on-site, travel to deliver courses at other sites in the UK, and design interactive courses for use on the BBC's internal network.

Because of its convenience as a BBC facility, Wood Norton was used for some of the filming of the 1970 Doctor Who serial Spearhead from Space. The filming included location shots inside the secret nuclear bunker (the scenes of Brigadier Lethbridge-Stewart's office and The Doctor's laboratory), and all involved with the shooting in those areas were required to abide by the Official Secrets Act and disclose no information about the bunker's existence. It was later used for all of the location filming of the 1974 Doctor Who serial Robot

Under the leadership of Greg Dyke and Resources director Mike Southgate, the BBC sold off the residential accommodation used by trainees, which had been built by the corporation 20 years previously.

Wood Norton Hall itself was a privately owned hotel and conference centre, but closed in 2005, reopening under new management the following year. The hotel finally ceased trading in 2010, was sold to a London investor in 2011, underwent a £4m renovation and reopened in November 2012 as a member of the Bespoke Hotels Group, however is no longer affiliated with the group. The BBC retains its Technical and Operational Training Centre in the extensive grounds.

Notes

References

Further reading
 Assigned to Listen - The Evesham Experience 1939-43, Olive Renier & Vladimir Rubinstein, BBC External Services 1986

External links
Hotel official website

Buildings and structures in Worcestershire
BBC offices, studios and buildings
Emergency management in the United Kingdom
Nuclear bunkers in the United Kingdom
Hotels in Worcestershire
Grade II* listed buildings in Worcestershire